The Quebec referendum on the prohibition of alcohol, held on April 10, 1919, considered the legalization of the sale of beer, cider and wine in the province of Quebec, Canada. The 'yes' side won with 78.62% of the votes.

The question asked 
The question asked in English on the ballot paper was: "Should sale of light beer, cider and wines be allowed?"

In French, the question was: "Êtes-vous d'opinion que la vente des bières, cidres et vins légers, tels que définis par la loi, devrait être permise?"

The results of the vote 
178,112 persons (78.62%) voted in favour of the proposal, while 48,433 (21.38%) voted against; proposal was therefore passed with a majority of 129,679 votes. The analysis of the vote by riding reveals that all voted in favour except for seven: Pontiac, Compton, Dorchester, Huntingdon, Brome, Stanstead and Richmond.

The result of the vote was that the subsequent prohibition law which became effective on May 1, 1919 only applied to spirits. The victory of the "moderate" prohibitionists over the "radicals" did not have immediate repercussion on the legal sale of alcohol for in 1919, 90% of Quebec municipalities were prohibiting its sale locally. Indeed, Trois-Rivières, Lévis, Lachine, Sainte-Agathe, Louiseville, Sainte-Rose and Terrebonne had voted for local prohibition in 1915, while Quebec City had done the same on October 4, 1917. All these regulations had to be rescinded, one municipality at a time.

Prohibition was finally abolished on May 1, 1921 when the Alcoholic Beverages Act creating the Commission des liqueurs du Québec entered into force.

Notes

References
 Lacoursière, Jacques (1997). Histoire populaire du Québec. Tome 4, Sillery: Septentrion (preview)
 Prévost, Robert, Suzanne Gagné and Michel Phaneuf (1986). L'histoire de l'alcool au Québec, Montréal: Société des alcools du Québec, 239 p.

See also
 1898 Canadian prohibition plebiscite
 1920 Canadian liquor plebiscite

Referendums in Quebec
1919 in Quebec
1919 elections in Canada
1919 referendums
Canadian prohibition referendums
April 1919 events